The British Rail Class 799 are tri-mode multiple units prototype adapted from Class 319 electric multiple units (319001/382). The existing 25 kV AC and 750 V DC equipment has been retained with a hydrogen fuel cell added, currently taking up one of the carriages.

History
The Class 319 units were built by BREL between 1987 and 1990 for Network SouthEast, as dual-voltage units to run on Thameslink services. In late 2014, Govia Thameslink Railway began returning its allocation of Class 319 units to Porterbrook (the owner of the units) as they were gradually replaced by  units and then ultimately  units on Thameslink services.

In September 2018, Porterbrook announced it would develop a hydrogen fuel cell demonstrator in partnership with the University of Birmingham's Centre for Railway Research and Education. In December 2018, Porterbrook procured an FCveloCity fuel cell unit from Ballard Power Systems.

The first unit was converted from Class 319 EMU 319001 that had last been used by Govia Thameslink Railway. It was unveiled on 20 June 2019. In June 2019, it was announced that approval for mainline testing of the unit (branded as HydroFLEX) had been granted after a period of demonstration at Rail Live 2019.

The first mainline testing occurred in September 2020, reaching  through Warwickshire. The next phase of the development of this prototype is move the hydrogen tanks and fuel cell from one of the carriages and suspend them beneath the train.

A second unit (converted from 319382) was showcased at the COP26 Summit at Glasgow with one of the DT car's passenger doors removed and permanently sealed, the TSOL has also been reconfigured with a boardroom styled interior specially for the COP26 Summit. The unit is numbered to 799201 but retains the car numbers from 319382.

Fleet details

References

External links
 BBC profile on the Hydroflex train

799
Hybrid multiple units
Train-related introductions in 2019
750 V DC multiple units
25 kV AC multiple units